Muggers is a 2000 Australian black comedy about two medical students who are falling behind in their studies through lack of money. They become involved in the theft of kidneys from recently deceased bodies, in competition with a pair of ambulance paramedics who are running a similar racket.

Home media
Muggers was released on DVD by Magna Pacific.

References

External links

Australian comedy films
2000 comedy films
2000 films
2000s English-language films
1990s English-language films
1990s Australian films